Dún Laoghaire (Mallin) railway station is a station in Dún Laoghaire, Dún Laoghaire–Rathdown, Ireland.

Services

Dún Laoghaire has two through platforms and one terminal platform. Unusually, the station building is on a bridge above the platforms, in a setup similar to Leixlip Louisa Bridge railway station. The station has a ticket office, automatic ticket machines and a small coffee shop. The ticket office is open between 05:45-00:06 AM, Monday to Sunday.

DART 
From the inception of the Dublin Area Rapid Transit (DART) service in 1984, all DART services stop at Dún Laoghaire.

Other services 
Dún Laoghaire is on the intercity Dublin-Rosslare and commuter Dundalk-Dublin-Arklow-Gorey routes and all trains on these routes stop here. They often run non-stop between Dun Laoghaire and Dublin Pearse, and freight and maintenance trains pass through Dún Laoghaire without stopping.

History
The original station for Dún Laoghaire, then known as Kingstown, was situated some  closer to Dublin at the West Pier near to or at the present-day Salthill and Monkstown railway station. That station was the southern terminus of the first railway in Ireland, the Dublin and Kingstown Railway (D&KR), which opened in 1834.  For the first public timetable the station was named Kingstown but in contract documents it was at least sometimes referred to as Dunleary.

Before the D&KR had even begun to be built it became apparent that the Packet boats were to use either the East Pier or the new wharf being built.  Therefore, in 1833 the D&KR raised a parliamentary bill so its railway could be extended beyond the East Pier with a new station at Kingstown then on to Dalkey. Mobilised opposition from a rival canal group and local opposition caused the Bill to fail in June 1833.

The D&KR regrouped and with lobbying presented a less ambitious Bill to the site of the current station only in 1834. Thomas M. Gresham, a D&KR shareholder and main spokesperson for the opposition, being awarded a silver plate in August 1833 for the same at a personal cost of £1,200, was persuaded not to oppose the 1834 bill. Other obstacles including an agreement to cross the old part of Dunleary harbour and demolition of a Martello fortification needed an agreement with the Admiralty and Ordnance. The Bill was passed in May 1834 but logistics meant Dargan began work in May 1836 finishing about a year later. The new terminus opened on 13 May 1837, the first train being a special with D&KR directors and friends.

The original station building was an apparently insufficient Station House and Parcel Office and in 1840 the D&KR resolved to replace it.  The platforms were finally covered in 1845 by a temporary structure costing £122 which was later extended for £300.

On 29 March 1844, the Dalkey Atmospheric Railway officially opened.  The line was a branch of the existing D&KR which diverged to the south when approaching from the west with an interchange platform before the atmospheric ran as a single track eastbound into the tunnel.  While through running was possible it was not used.

Grierson notes that the station build was completed in 1853 to a design by John Skipton Mulvany by Mr. Roberts doing the "masonry, carpentry, ironmongery, &c," for £1,665.  This included the station walls, while ironwork, roof, and plumbing cost £1,031 by I. & R. Mallet.  The roof has since been removed.  The station house above the platforms was completed in 1854. a structure in a neo-classical style, designed also by Mulvany. This was the station building until 1971 when the current arrangement was introduced. Mulvany's building became reused as a restaurant.

The Dalkey Atmospheric ceased operation in 1854. The Dublin, Wicklow and Wexford Railway exercised their rights and rebuilt the Dalkey to Kingstown section as a conventional railway at  removing height restrictions. When they ran their first train into Kingstown on 10 October 1855, the D&KR directors refused them the use of the station and the passengers were forced to return towards Dalkey, this also happening for some days afterwards. On 30 March 1856, both the D&KR and D&WR concurred with the D&KR's engineer D. B. Gibbons assessment that the rebuild under Brunel was not to the parliamentary approved specification in terms and had safety issues and it was closed for rework by William Dargan as an accident would be disastrous for both companies. Dargan converted the down line between Kingstown and Old Dun Leary harbour to dual gauge so the spoil could be dumped there. and was able to complete the re-work quickly. When the Dalkey-Bray section re-opened on 1 July 1856 the D&KR handed all its operations to the D&WR.

Carlisle Pier with its branch on the single track section just to the east of the station was created in 1859.

Although it lay on a double-track railway for over ninety years, Dún Laoghaire station had only one through the platform with a bay platform facing Dublin, both on the seaward side of the station. The station lay on a short section of a single line that ran from just north of the station, to just past the junction for the branch to Carlisle Pier, which was controlled by a signal box known as the 'Hole in the Wall Box.' This arrangement created a bottleneck for intensive steam-hauled suburban services to/from Bray. It was not until 1957 that CIÉ remedied the situation by providing a second through the platform. Further improvements were carried out in connection with the introduction of DART electric trains in 1984.

A replacement station entrance, with a combined ticket office and automated barriers, was built above the railway lines at street level in 1998. It was constructed with a steel framework supporting a taut sail-like canopy and with glazed panels as side features.

Naming
Also called Kingstown Harbour the station was renamed Kingstown in 1861, and renamed Dún Laoghaire in 1921. It was given the additional name "Mallin" on 10 April 1966, 50 years after the Easter Rising, when Córas Iompair Éireann renamed 15 major stations after Republican leaders. It is named in honour of Michael Mallin, a leader in the 1916 Easter Rising. although it is usually referred to simply as Dún Laoghaire.

Transport services 
Directly outside the station are bus stops for Dublin Bus, Go-Ahead Ireland and other private bus operator routes:

Dublin Bus Routes:

 46a - Phoenix Park to Dún Laoghaire Station, via Dublin city centre
 Dublin Bus 7N Nitelink from Dublin city centre to Shankill, via Dún Laoghaire Station (Fri & Sat only)

Go-Ahead Ireland routes:

 45a / 45b - Dun Laoghaire Station to Kilmacanogue, via Bray
 59 - Dún Laoghaire Station to Killiney, via Dalkey
 63 -  Dún Laoghaire Station to Kilternan, via Foxrock
 75 / 75a - Dún Laoghaire Station to Tallaght, via Stillorgan
 111 - Dalkey to Bride's Glen, via Dún Laoghaire Station. This route provides a connection to the Luas Green Line terminus at Bride's Glen

In addition, a number of bus services stop at Marine Road / George's Street, located less than 350m from the station.

 Dublin Bus routes 7 / 7A  from Mountjoy Square to Bride's Glen / Loughlinstown. Route 7 provides a connection to the Luas Green Line terminus at Bride's Glen
 Aircoach route 703 from Killiney to Dublin Airport, via Dún Laoghaire

There is also a busy taxi rank near the station on Marine Road, and a large car park adjacent to the station in the harbour area.

The station is where the Killiney-Dún Laoghaire footpath "The Metals" (Ná Ráillí) ends.

The station is next to the former Dún Laoghaire Ferryport, for Stena Line services to Holyhead. This service ceased in September 2014.

See also
 List of railway stations in Ireland

Gallery

Notes

References

Sources

External links

Irish Rail Dún Laoghaire Station Website

Iarnród Éireann stations in Dún Laoghaire–Rathdown
Railway stations serving harbours and ports in Ireland
Dún Laoghaire
1837 establishments in Ireland
Railway stations in the Republic of Ireland opened in 1837